The 1991 First Union 400 was the seventh stock car race of the 1991 NASCAR Winston Cup Series and the 41st iteration of the event. The race was held on Sunday, April 21, 1991, before an audience of 41,500 in North Wilkesboro, North Carolina at the North Wilkesboro Speedway, a  oval short track. The race took the scheduled 400 laps to complete. At race's end, owner-driver Darrell Waltrip would manage to get his car away from the chaotic nature of the race, leading the final 52 laps to take his 80th career NASCAR Winston Cup Series victory and his first victory of the season. To fill out the top three, Richard Childress Racing driver Dale Earnhardt and Travis Carter Enterprises driver Jimmy Spencer would finish second and third, respectively.

Background 

North Wilkesboro Speedway is a short oval racetrack located on U.S. Route 421, about five miles east of the town of North Wilkesboro, North Carolina, or 80 miles north of Charlotte. It measures  and features a unique uphill backstretch and downhill frontstretch. It has previously held races in NASCAR's top three series, including 93 Winston Cup Series races. The track, a NASCAR original, operated from 1949, NASCAR's inception, until the track's original closure in 1996. The speedway briefly reopened in 2010 and hosted several stock car series races before closing again in the spring of 2011. It was re-opened in August 2022 for grassroots racing.

Entry list 

 (R) denotes rookie driver.

*After sustaining burns in a crash at the 1991 Valleydale Meats 500, Sterling Marlin would be replaced by relief driver Charlie Glotzbach for qualifying.  During the race, Marlin would manage to start the race, before being replaced by Glotzbach one lap into the race. As a result of starting the race, Marlin is credited with the finish.

Qualifying 
Qualifying was originally scheduled to be split into two rounds. The first round was scheduled to be held on Friday, April 19, at 3:00 PM EST. However, due to fog, the first round was cancelled, and qualifying was condensed into one round, which was held on Saturday, April 20, at 12:15 AM EST. Each driver would have one lap to set a time. For this specific race, positions 1–30 would be decided on time, and depending on who needed it, a select amount of positions were given to cars who had not otherwise qualified but were high enough in owner's points; up to two provisionals were given. If needed, a past champion who did not qualify on either time or provisionals could use a champion's provisional, adding one more spot to the field.

Eight drivers would fail to qualify.

Full qualifying results

Race results

Standings after the race 

Drivers' Championship standings

Note: Only the first 10 positions are included for the driver standings.

References 

1991 NASCAR Winston Cup Series
NASCAR races at North Wilkesboro Speedway
April 1991 sports events in the United States
1991 in sports in North Carolina